Our Common Heritage – Great Poems Celebrating Milestones in the History of America is a Decca Records album of phonograph records by various artists celebrating American ideals and patriotic themes. The album was edited, with notes, by Louis Untermeyer; original music and sound effects were composed by Victor Young and Lehman Engel with the Jean Neilson Verse Choir. Artists reading are Brian Donlevy, Agnes Moorehead, Fredric March, Walter Huston, Pat O'Brien, and Bing Crosby.

Reception
Howard Taubman, writing in The New York Times heralded the release of the album. “With considerable beating of the drums, Decca has issued an album called “Our Common Heritage” (eight 10 inch records). It contains sixteen poems commemorating “milestones in the history of America.” Jack Kapp, president of Decca is keynoting the campaign for this album [and writes] “Who else but Bing Crosby, who symbolises America to the world, should read The Star-Spangled Banner? And who else should make it a living experience, read as we believe Francis Scott Key felt it?” Who else, indeed? Unless of course, it should occur to you that you could read it for yourself....If it makes American ideals shine more brightly for them to hear Bing Crosby, Pat O’Brien and the others dramatize them, only a bounder would disagree with Mr. Kapp.”

Track listing
These songs were featured on an 8-disc, 78 rpm album set, Decca Album No. A-536.

Disc 1: (40030)

Disc 2: (40031)

Disc 3: (40032)

Disc 4: (40033)

Disc 5: (40034)

Disc 6: (40035)

Disc 7: (40036)

Disc 8: (40037)

LP release
The album was re-released as a 12” LP (DL 9072) in 1959.

LP track listing
SIDE ONE
 “Columbus"
 "The American Flag”
 “Landing of the Pilgrim Fathers" 
 "Barbara Frietchie" 
 "Paul Revere’s Ride"
 "Paul Revere’s Ride"
 “Warren’s Address to American Soldiers (June 17, 1775) / Concord Hymn"
 "Hail Columbia" 
SIDE TWO
 “America”
 “Sheridan’s Ride" 
 "The Star-Spangled Banner"
 “Old Ironsides 
 "Nancy Hanks" 
 “Lincoln, Man of the People" 
 “O Captain! My Captain!"
 "Abraham Lincoln Walks at Midnight"

References

Bing Crosby albums
1947 albums
Decca Records albums
Spoken word albums by American artists